The 2034 Asian Games, officially known as the XXII Asiad and commonly known as Riyadh 2034, will be the twenty-second edition of the Asian Games, a pan-Asian multi-sport event to be held in Riyadh, Saudi Arabia.

Riyadh was elected as the host city at the 39th OCA General Assembly on 16 December 2020 in Muscat, Oman. This will be the first Asian Games held in Saudi Arabia, as well as the third and the last of two consecutive Asian Games held in Arabian Peninsula as the previous edition is set to be held in Doha, Qatar.

Bidding process 

An Olympic Council of Asia's (OCA) Evaluation Committee led by Andrey Krukov from Kazakhstan inspected the candidate cities of Doha and Riyadh. The OCA voted on 16 December 2020 at the 39th OCA General Assembly in Muscat, Oman to select the host city for the 2030 Asian Games. The OCA confirmed on 23 April 2020, that the Saudi Arabian Olympic Committee had submitted the bid documents and the letters of support from the Government of Saudi Arabia to host the Games in Riyadh. On 15 December 2020, OCA President Sheikh Ahmad Al-Fahad Al-Sabah announced that he would attempt to find a dual-host city solution to avoid a vote for the 2030 Asian Games, by persuading one city to host the event in 2030 and the other to organize the competition in 2034. On 16 December 2020, it was announced that Doha will host 2030 Games with the highest votes and Riyadh will host the 2034 Games. Saudi Arabia had asked the OCA to halt electronic voting on the host of the 2030 Asian Games due to "the possibility of technical fraud".

Venues

Asian Games Park, Qiddiya
Qiddiya Stadium – football (finals) / 20,000 new
Qiddiya Arena – basketball / 18,000 new
E-Games Arena – esports, fencing / TBA new
Tennis Center – tennis / TBA new
Aquatics Center – artistic swimming, diving, swimming / 3,000 new
Baseball Ground – baseball, softball / TBA new
Cricket Ground – cricket / TBA new
Cycling Park – cycling (mountain bike) / TBA new
BMX Park 1 – cycling (BMX freestyle) / TBA new
BMX Park 2 – cycling (BMX race) / TBA new
Motion Stadium – athletics (marathon), cycling (road) / TBA new
White Water Stadium – canoeing / TBA new

King Saud University
King Saud University Stadium – football (preliminaries) / 25,000 existing
King Saud University Arena – volleyball / 7,500 existing
Multipurpose Hall – boxing / TBA existing
Dome A – wushu / TBA existing/renovated
Dome B – sepak takraw / 3,000 existing/renovated
Hockey Stadium – field hockey / TBA new
 Rugby Stadium – rugby sevens / TBA existing

Diriyah
Urban Sports Park – sport climbing, skateboarding  3x3 basketball, breaking

SAOC Complex 
Green Hall 1 – handball / 5,189 existing
Green Hall 2 – water polo / 1,814 existing
Bowling Center – bowling / TBA existing
Archery Range – archery (preliminaries) / TBA existing/renovated
Velodrome – cycling (track) / TBA new

Riyadh International Convention and Exhbition Center
Hall 1 – gymnastics / TBA existing
Hall 2 – badminton / TBA existing
Hall 3 – table tennis, wrestling / TBA existing
Al Duhami Equestrian Center – equestrian (dressage, jumping) / TBA existing
King Fahd Cultural Center – weightlifting / TBA existing
Al Bujairi Arena – athletics (marathon), cycling (road) / TBA temporary

Riyadh stand alone venues 
Prince Faisal bin Fahd Stadium – athletics (track events) / 22,500 existing/renovated
Malaz Hall 1 – ju-jitsu, kurash, taekwondo / TBA existing/renovated
Malaz Hall 2 – karate, judo / TBA new
Masmak Fortress – archery (finals), athletics (field events) / TBA temporary
King Fahd International Stadium – opening and closing ceremonies,football (finals) / 60,000 existing
Janadriyah Hippodrome – camel racing, modern pentathlon / TBA existing
King Abdulaziz Equestrian Field – equestrian (eventing) / TBA existing
Nofa Golf Resort – golf / TBA existing
Shooting Center – shooting / TBA existing

Al Khobar 
Regatta Course – canoeing (sprint) / TBA existing
Sailing Marina – sailing / TBA existing
Surfing Beach – surfing / TBA existing
Yacht Harbour – marathon swimming, triathlon / TBA existing
Beach Volleyball Stadium – beach volleyball / TBA existing
Prince Mohamed bin Fahd Stadium – football (preliminaries) / 26,000 existing
Prince Saud bin Jalawi Stadium – football (preliminaries) / 20,100 existing

References

External links
 Riyadh 2034 official website

 
Asian Games
Asian Games
Asian Games by year
Asian Games 2034
International sports competitions hosted by Saudi Arabia
Sport in Riyadh